The GE 65-ton switcher is a diesel-electric locomotive built by General Electric. It has a B-B wheel arrangement, with models producing 400–550 horsepower. 

The 65-ton is an upgraded GE 44-ton with a heavier frame and a more powerful diesel engine. 

There is also a Steeplecab electric variant of this locomotive that was ordered by the Sacramento Northern.

References

External links
 Diesel Loco #1943, an operational unit at White Mountain Central Railroad

65-ton switcher
B-B locomotives
Diesel-electric locomotives of the United States
Standard gauge locomotives of the United States